Barkley Valley is a former gold-mining community and now ghost town located on the easternmost fork of Haylmore Creek in the Cayoosh Range of the Lillooet Country of the Southern Interior of British Columbia, Canada.

See also
List of ghost towns in British Columbia

References

Lillooet Country
Mining communities in British Columbia
Valleys of British Columbia
Company towns in Canada
Ghost towns in British Columbia